The Women's downhill competition of the Sapporo 1972 Olympics was held at Mount Eniwa on Saturday, February 5.

The defending world champion was Annerosli Zryd of Switzerland, while Austria's Annemarie Moser-Pröll was the defending World Cup downhill champion and led the current season. Defending Olympic champion Olga Pall retired from competition two years earlier.

Marie-Theres Nadig of Switzerland won the gold medal, Moser-Pröll took the silver, and American Susan Corrock was the bronze medalist.

Results
Saturday, February 5, 1972 
The race was started at 13:30 local time, (UTC+9).

References

External links
 YouTube.com - 1972 Winter Olympics - Women's Downhill medalists' runs - from Japanese television

Women's downhill
Alp
Oly
Women's downhill